The 2008 FAW Premier Cup Final was the final of the 11th season of the FAW Premier Cup. The final was played at Newport Stadium in Newport on 11 March 2008 and marked the second time the final has been staged at the stadium. The match was contested by Newport County and Llanelli.

Route to the final

Newport County
Newport County scores are shown first in every match

Llanelli
Llanelli scores are shown first in every match

Match

2008
Finals
Newport County A.F.C. matches